In organic chemistry, 1-propenyl (or simply propenyl) has the formula CH=CHCH3 and 2-propenyl (isopropenyl) has the formula CH2=C-CH3. These groups are found in many compounds. Propenyl compounds are  isomeric with allyl compounds, which have the formula CH2-CH=CH2.

Chemicals with 1-propenyl groups
2-chloropropylene
propenylbenzene (β-methylstyrene).  
Many phenylpropanoids and their derivatives feature derivatives of propenylbenzene:
Anethole
Asarone
Carpacin
Coniferyl alcohol
Isoeugenol
Isosafrole
Methyl isoeugenol
Pseudoisoeugenol

Chemicals with 2-propenyl groups

Several terpenes feature 2-propenyl substituents:
carvone
limonene

See also
 Propene
 Functional group

References

Alkenyl groups